The 1960 Kansas City Athletics season was the sixth in Kansas City and the 60th overall.  It involved the A's finishing eighth in the American League with a record of 58 wins and 96 losses, 39 games behind the AL Champion New York Yankees.

Offseason 
At the 1959 Winter Meetings, Pittsburgh Pirates General Manager Joe L. Brown had agreed to trade Dick Groat to the Kansas City Athletics in exchange for Roger Maris. Pirates' manager Danny Murtaugh had advised Brown that he did not want to lose Groat, and the deal was never finalized. Maris was traded to the New York Yankees on December 11.

On March 10, 1960, owner Arnold Johnson died at the age of 53. After the 1960 season, the team would be sold by Johnson's estate to businessman Charlie Finley.

Notable transactions 
 November 21, 1959: Frank House was traded by the Athletics to the Cincinnati Redlegs for Tom Acker.
 December 11, 1959: Roger Maris, Joe DeMaestri and Kent Hadley were traded by the Athletics to the New York Yankees for Don Larsen, Hank Bauer, Norm Siebern, and Marv Throneberry.

Regular season

Season standings

Record vs. opponents

Notable transactions 
 May 19, 1960: Bob Cerv was traded by the Athletics to the New York Yankees for Andy Carey.
 July 26, 1960: Harry Chiti was purchased from the Athletics by the Detroit Tigers.

Roster

Player stats

Batting

Starters by position 
Note: Pos = Position; G = Games played; AB = At bats; R = Runs scored; H = Hits; Avg. = Batting average; HR = Home runs; RBI = Runs batted in

Other batters 
Note: G = Games played; AB = At bats; R = Runs scored; H = Hits; Avg. = Batting average; HR = Home runs; RBI = Runs batted in

Pitching

Starting pitchers 
Note: G = Games pitched; IP = Innings pitched; W = Wins; L = Losses; ERA = Earned run average; SO = Strikeouts

Other pitchers 
Note: G = Games pitched; IP = Innings pitched; W = Wins; L = Losses; ERA = Earned run average; SO = Strikeouts

Relief pitchers 
Note: G = Games pitched; W = Wins; L = Losses; SV = Saves; ERA = Earned run average; SO = Strikeouts

Farm system

References

External links
1960 Kansas City Athletics team page at Baseball Reference
1960 Kansas City Athletics team page at www.baseball-almanac.com

Oakland Athletics seasons
Kansas City Athletics season
1960 in sports in Missouri